The 9th Aero Squadron was an Air Service, United States Army unit that fought on the Western Front during World War I.

The squadron was assigned as an Army Observation Squadron, performing long-range, strategic night reconnaissance over the entire length of the United States First Army sector of the Western Front in France. It was the only night reconnaissance squadron of the Air Service stationed on the Western Front, and the squadron's emblem reflects an aircraft, flying at night with searchlights searching for it in a IX pattern.

After the 1918 Armistice with Germany, the squadron was assigned to the United States Third Army as part of the Occupation of the Rhineland in Germany. It returned to the United States in June 1919 and became part of the permanent United States Army Air Service in 1921, being re-designated as the 9th Squadron (Observation).

The current United States Air Force unit which holds its lineage and history is the 9th Bomb Squadron, assigned to the 7th Operations Group, Dyess Air Force Base, Texas.

History

Origins 
The 9th Bomb Squadron origins begin on 30 May 1917, when Company E, Provisional Aviation School Squadron at Kelly Field, San Antonio Texas was designated as a separate unit. The men, who had been in training for about a month, were officially designated as the 9th Aero Squadron on 14 June. On 5 July, the squadron was ordered to a new airfield at Mt. Clemens, Michigan, where, with the 8th Aero Squadron, opened what became known as Selfridge Field. At Selfridge, the men of the 9th assembled a Curtiss JN-4 Jenny, the first airplane to ever fly there.  The airfield was still mostly pasture land, and construction of accommodations were underway for 150 aircraft at the field.  The airfield was gearing up to train men in flying, bombing, radio and photography for the war effort. During the summer of 1917, 72 men won aviator ratings and logged over 3,700 flying hours.

On 27 October, the squadron was ordered to Mineola Field, Mineola, Long Island, New York to prepare for overseas service.  It sailed from Halifax, Nova Scotia on 27 November 1917 and made an unremarkable voyage to Liverpool, England, arriving on 7 December.  After disembarking, the squadron was marched from the docks to the Liverpool railway station where it boarded a London and North Western Railway train which took them to Winchester, on the south coast of England.  Upon arrival, the squadron was moved to the Romsey Rest Camp.

At Romsey, the squadron was ordered for six months training in England under the Royal Flying Corps.  It was split up into four flights. Flight "A" was sent to South Charleton in Devon for training on Sopwith Camel fighters; Flight "B" to Scampton, Lincolnshire for training on Sopwith Pup scout aircraft; Flight "C" to Spitalgate, near Grantham, Lincolnshire for observation training and Flight "D" to Harlaxton, Lincolnshire for motor mechanic instruction.  In February 1918, the squadron was re-assembled at Spitalgate and shortly afterwards it took over the work of 12 Group, 24th Wing, Royal Flying Corps, becoming the first American squadron to be assigned to duty with a British Flight, however it was commanded by a British RFC officer at the time.

On 7 August 1918, the squadron left Spitalgate and travelled to Southampton where it embarked on a cross-channel ferry to Le Havre, Upper Normandy, France, arriving on 13 August. On 16 August, it arrived at Air Service Replacement Concentration Barracks, St. Maixent, which was the primary reception center for new units assigned to American Expeditionary Forces. There the 9th was organised for night flying and reconnaissance duties, the first US squadron to do so. Night reconnaissance had been tried with indifferent success by the French and with fairly good results by the British.  Replacements of enlisted personnel were made and on 23 August the squadron arrived at the 1st Air Depot, Colombey-les-Belles Airdrome, where the squadron was fully equipped with all manner of supplies and equipment. At Colombey, the squadron was equipped with French Breguet 14A2 reconnaissance aircraft equipped with a camera, with some carrying radios. Poor equipment was issued to the squadron at the beginning of operations, part of the flares and landing lights being condemned products from other armies.  The equipment was speedily gotten rid of by the squadron which had complained to the Supply Depot and better equipment was secured.

An effort was made to secure experienced pilots and observers from older squadrons, but this proved impractical.  New pilots with little night flying and observers with no night experience were received by the squadron.  These men had to be trained in night work before they could begin operations over the lines.  This obstacle in conjunction with bad night weather, was responsible for the slow start of the squadron.  The 9th was then assigned to the 1st Army Observation Group, Air Service, First Army, and transferred to the Headquarters, Night Reconnaissance Bombing Group at Amanty Airdrome in the Toul Sector.

Combat Operations
At Amaty, the first patrol was made over the lines on the night of 14 September 1918.  Regular flights were made thereafter.  "A" Flight would be on duty from dark until 01:00; "B" Flight from 01:00 until dawn each night. Flying was between 700 and 1200 meters altitude. Operations orders were issued each day for the nightly operations, taking off at staggered times.  To reduce visibility of the aircraft when performing night missions aircraft were painted in black.  Operations orders delineated the areas to be flown over by each sortie.  During each mission, the observers would look for railroad activity with trains moving; road convoys; lighted areas indicating troop concentrations; locations of anti-aircraft artillery and searchlights, carefully noting their locations.  Not all missions were successful, as weather would interfere with observations, and night fogs would cover the ground, making observations impossible.

As the war progressed the unit participated in many night missions and battles. Most famous of those battles were the Battle of Lorraine, Battle of Saint-Mihiel, and the Meuse-Argonne Offensive. For those, the unit earned their first battle streamers.  The flying of night reconnaissance was a learning effort, as well as an operational necessity.  The squadron history is replete with notes such as the following:
  "..On a full moonlight night or an approximately full moonlight night observation is easy and can be carried on from a height of from 1,000 to 1,500 meters.  Artificial flares are not necessary unless very detailed information is required when a lower altitude becomes necessary..." 
  "..When enemy search lights are sweeping the sky searching for one, it is best to refrain from shooting till they actually find and hold the light on the plane, for the tracer bullets are an aid to the searchers in locating the fliers position.  As soon, however, as ones position is discovered the use of quick, well directed machine gun fire will greatly disturb the men directing the light and aid the pilot in eluding the trap.." 
  "..In shooting up a train load of troops or motor transports, one should drop to a level of three hundred meters or lower, and rake the train in a longitudinal manner.  Good coordination between the pilot and observer is essential as the machine (aircraft) should be flown slowly, straight and as nearly as possible in a direction parallel to the movement of the target to get the best results.." 

On 24 September, the squadron was moved north from Amaty to Vavincourt Aerodrome.  Night reconnaissance flights were performed during the Meuse-Argonne offensive as weather conditions permitted.  On 24 September an attack was made on squadron aircraft by two enemy chase planes. The planes were not identified until they were less than 100 meters away. The forward aircraft was firing when it was first observed.  By diving rapidly, first to the right, then to the left, the 9th squadron aircraft escaped, although the two enemy planes were seen several hundred meters above searching.  Four days later information was received from the Intelligence Department that a night reconnaissance flight had been identified on one of the enemy airdromes.  Although the planes of our Allies were attacked three times after this incident, the planes of the 9th met no further resistance in the air.  The squadron remained at Vavincourt until the armistice on 11 November.

Third Army of occupation
After the war had drawn to a close, the unit was moved Germany to serve as part of the occupation force of the Rhineland under the Third Army Air Service. The 9th was initially assigned as a courier squadron for Headquarters Third Army, flying from Coblenz Aerodrome.  The squadron was also able to perform test flights on surrendered German aircraft. Flights of the Fokker D.VII, Pfalz D.XII, Halberstadts and Rumpler aircraft were made and evaluations were made.

On 15 April 1919, the 9th was reassigned to the VII Corps Observation Group at Trier Aerodrome, where it became part of the infantry liaison school where it assisted in the training of infantry units to work with Air Service units and vice versa.

On 12 May 1919, the squadron first went to the 1st Air Depot at Colombey-les-Belles Airdrome, to turn in all of its supplies and equipment and was relieved from duty with the AEF.  The squadron's Breguet aircraft were delivered to the Air Service American Air Service Acceptance Park No. 1 at Orly Aerodrome to be returned to the French.  There practically all of the pilots and observers were detached from the squadron.

Personnel were subsequently assigned to the commanding general, services of supply, and ordered to report to the Marseilles staging camp.  There, personnel awaited scheduling for transport to the United States. Upon return to the US, most squadron personnel were demobilized at Mitchell Field, New York.

Lineage
 Organized as 9th Aero Squadron on 14 June 1917
 Re-designated: 9th Aero Squadron (Night Observation), 30 August 1918
 Re-designated: 9th Aero Squadron (Corps Observation), 15 April 1919
 Re-designated: 9th Corps Observation Squadron, 22 July 1919

Assignments

 Post Headquarters, Camp Kelly, 14 June-8 July 1917
 Post Headquarters, Camp Selfridge, 8 July-28 October 1917
 Air Service Headquarters, AEF, British Isles, 28 October 1917 – 16 August 1918
 Attached to the Royal Flying Corps for training, 7 December 1917 – 16 August 1918
 Replacement Concentration Center, AEF, 16–23 August 1918
 1st Air Depot, AEF, 23–28 August 1918

 First Army Observation Group, 30 August 1918
 Third Army Air Service, 21 November 1918
 VII Corps Observation Group, 15 April 1919
 1st Air Depot, AEF, 18–25 May 1919
 Commanding General, Services of Supply, 25 May-7 June 1919
 Post Headquarters, Mitchell Field, 8 June 1919
 Post Headquarters, Park Field, 12 July 1919
 Western Department, 22 July 1919

Stations

 Camp Kelly, Texas, 14 June 1917
 Selfridge Field, Michigan, 8 July 1917
 Mineola Field, Mineola, Long Island, 28 October 1917
 Port of Entry, Hoboken, New Jersey
 Trans-Atlantic crossing: 27 November-7 December 1917
 Liverpool, England, 7 December
 Romsey Rest Camp, Winchester, England, 7 December
 Squadron separated into flights for training with RFC
 "A" Flight: South Charleton Aerodrome, Devon
 "B" Flight: Scampton Aerodrome, Lincolnshire
 "C" Flight: Spittlegate Aerodrome, Lincolnshire
 "D" Flight: Harlaxton Aerodrome, Lincolnshire
 Re-assembled at Spittlegate Aerodrome, Lincolnshire, February, 1918

 Southampton, England, 7 August 1918
 Le Havre, France, 13 August 1918
 St. Maixent Replacement Barracks, France, 16 August 1918
 Colombey-les-Belles Airdrome, France, 23 August 1918
 Amanty Airdrome, 28 August 1918
 Vavincourt Aerodrome, France, 24 September 1918
 Preutin, France, 21 November 1918
 Trier Aerodrome, 5 December 1918
 Coblenz Aerodrome, Germany, c. 16 December 1918
 Trier Aerodrome, 15 April 1919
 Colombey-les-Belles Airdrome, France, 18 May 1919
 Marseilles, France, 25 May-7 Jun 1919
 Park Field, Tennessee, 12 July 1919
 March Field, California, 22 July 1919

Enemy aircraft flown for evaluation

LVG C.VI (1919)
Fokker D.VII (1919)
Pfalz D.XII (1919)
DFW C.V (1919)

Halberstadt CL.IV (1919)
Halberstadt C.V (1919)
Rumpler C.I (1919)
Hannover CL.III (1919)

Combat sectors and campaigns

Notable personnel
 Lt. Dache M. Reeves, Distinguished Service Cross, Silver Star Citation

See also

 Organization of the Air Service of the American Expeditionary Force
 List of American Aero Squadrons

References

External links

Squadrons of the United States Army Air Service
Military units and formations established in 1917